Faccia di spia (also known as C.I.A. Secret Story) is a 1975 Italian political drama film written and directed by Giuseppe Ferrara.

Cast 
Adalberto Maria Merli as captain Felix Ramos
Mariangela Melato as Tania
Francisco Rabal as Mehdi Ben Barka
Riccardo Cucciolla as Giuseppe Pinelli 
Claudio Camaso as Che Guevara
George Ardisson as Patrick
Ugo Bologna as Salvador Allende
Dominique Boschero as Licia Pinelli
Lou Castel as the torturer
Gérard Landry as Mr. Rutherford

References

External links

1975 films
Italian political drama films
Films directed by Giuseppe Ferrara
1970s political drama films
Films about the Central Intelligence Agency
Films scored by Manos Hatzidakis
1975 drama films
1970s Italian films
1970s Italian-language films